Troy Township is one of the sixteen townships of Geauga County, Ohio, United States. As of the 2020 census the population was 2,778, up from 2,567 at the 2000 census.

Geography
Located in the southern part of the county, it borders the following townships:
Burton Township - north
Middlefield Township - northeast corner
Parkman Township - east
Nelson Township, Portage County - southeast corner
Hiram Township, Portage County - south
Mantua Township, Portage County - southwest corner
Auburn Township - west
Newbury Township - northwest corner

No municipalities are located in Troy Township, although the unincorporated community of Welshfield is located in the township's center.

Name and history
It is one of seven Troy Townships statewide.

Government
The township is governed by a three-member board of trustees, who are elected in November of odd-numbered years to a four-year term beginning on the following January 1. Two are elected in the year after the presidential election and one is elected in the year before it. There is also an elected township fiscal officer, who serves a four-year term beginning on April 1 of the year after the election, which is held in November of the year before the presidential election. Vacancies in the fiscal officership or on the board of trustees are filled by the remaining trustees.

References

External links
County website

Townships in Geauga County, Ohio
Cleveland metropolitan area
Townships in Ohio